Boreoiulus dollfusi is a species of millipede in the Blaniulidae family that can be found in Belgium, France and Spain.

References

Julida
Millipedes of Europe
Animals described in 1894